Maegan is a female given name. Notable people with the name include:

 Maegan Chant (born 1997), Canadian artistic gymnast
 Maegan Cottone, British-American songwriter
 Maegan Krifchin, American long-distance runner
 Maegan Manasse (born 1995), American tennis player
 Maegan Rosa (born 1992), American-Canadian soccer player